Doloploca supina is a species of moth of the family Tortricidae. It is found in China (Jiangsu).

The wingspan is about 22 mm. The ground colour of the forewings is pale brownish cream, mixed slightly with ochreous beyond the disk, suffused and sprinkled with brownish grey. The hindwings are pale brownish cream, darkening on the peripheries.

References

Moths described in 1975
Cnephasiini
Moths of Asia
Taxa named by Józef Razowski